The Lancia Thesis (Type 841) is a full-size car produced by Italian automaker Lancia between 2001 and 2009. It was available with naturally aspirated and turbocharged engines ranging between 2.0 and 3.2 litres, in both straight-5 or V6 configurations. Its appearance was based on the 1998 Diàlogos concept car. The production car premiered at the Geneva Motor Show in March 2001 and its interior was displayed for the first time at the Frankfurt Motor Show. Sales started in June 2002 in Italy, with export markets following shortly after.

History 

The earliest prototype of Thesis was used in the Great Jubilee, presented to Pope John Paul II, bearing very similar body although modified as a landaulet.

Concerning the design, Lancia's chief designer said "People will be looking for excuses not to buy this car. So, we wanted to be damn sure we didn't give them anything to hook onto." To that end the car was intended to match the substance of the Audi A6 and Mercedes-Benz E-Class. It was fitted with more technology and "more style". To convince buyers it was also priced to be 15% cheaper than the competition. In the view of motoring writer Paul Horrell of the UK's CAR Magazine the shape was "controversial, but certainly regenerates an authentic Italian alternative to the po-faced approach" of the competition. "Look at that extravagant front end, like a row of chrome-decorated sand dunes. The whole form is plump and carries telling details of bi-xenon headlights and multi-LED blades of tail-lamp – a comfortably fed and well-jewelled car like the folk who'll drive it". Discussing the interior, Horrell went on to say: "The effect is redoubled within. The cabin is truly rich, and walks the right side of that line in Italian style dividing the perfectly proportioned minimalism from their bling-bling rap-star Versace vulgarity." A notable feature of the interior was the use of high quality, lightly varnished wood trim and cast magnesium for the centre console. "I can't tell you," wrote Horrell "how much more satisfying it is to use a cupholder or ashtray that glides out of solid metal than some clacky plastic lid." After describing the engraved glassware of the instruments which were notable for their needles "floating at depth" CAR concluded that "it felt expensive".

Lancia invested heavily in the Thesis and, unlike the predecessor the Lancia Kappa which shared an automobile platform with the Alfa Romeo 166, the Thesis was designed with its own chassis. The car was fitted with a "complicated multi-arm aluminium-intensive suspension at both ends, augmented by Mannesmann Sachs 'Skyhook' adaptive dampers" which were also used on the Maserati Spyder. It was also the first Lancia with radar adaptive cruise control (by Bosch).

Describing the driving quality, Horrell wrote: "You can tell it's a heavy car, but there's no distress in letting this [test car with the V6 engine] build up a gentle sweat. Its autobox is attentive and smooth. The engine, though quieter than in any Alfa, is all you hear because road and wind noise have been quashed. Ditto rattles. This is a tight ship." The Thesis' ride is just terrific. It swallows big lumps, whatever your speed. Yet there's no heaving in distress; the adjustable dampers keep body motion in check. They're even better when the stress is lateral; considering the pillowy straight-line character, cornering roll is amazingly well-controlled." The main criticism was the steering which was considered by Horrell to be too light, and the slight tendency to understeer leading to intrusion of the ESP system. In conclusion, CAR's Horrell summed up the Thesis as being "far more accurate and even agile than it has any right to be."
CAR's view was that the Thesis was a dignified expression of Lancia's brand values, then. "Imagine a Rover 95 and you would be spookily close. It's a scary thought: two brands that refuse to be youthful or sporty, two brands that have underperformed." Other suggestions were that the car was a good product in the wrong market place. In this view, it would have been better to offer a vehicle in the Mondeo price range rather than the more conservative sector contested by the Mercedes E-Class and BMW 5 Series.

The Thesis is equipped with 6-speed manual or 5-speed automatic "Comfortronic" (not for 2.0) gearboxes. The interior was trimmed with leather or the suede-like Alcantara material long favoured by Lancia.
CAR's verdict was that "If Lancia can be turned around this is the car for the job." Despite its very comprehensive equipment level and the improved fit and finish, sales remained well behind its predecessor, the Kappa, quite far behind the competition and finally the model was discontinued at the beginning of 2009, after only 16,000 units built. The Thesis was replaced in 2011 by a new flagship sedan, based on the Chrysler 300, rebranded in continental Europe as the Lancia Thema.

Versions

Lancia Thesis Stola S85 

At the 2004 Geneva Motor Show, a  stretched limousine version prototype was shown, made by Stola S.p.A. and named as the "Stola S85" to celebrate the Stola company's 85 years. The car is equipped with a beige leather interior and electrically adjustable rear seats. The car has also a minibar with refrigerator, multimedia system with GPS navigation system, internet access, fax machine and a DVD player.

Notes

External links 

 Lancisti.net – An Information Exchange and Support Community for Lancia Owners and Enthusiasts

Thesis
Cars introduced in 2001
Cars discontinued in 2009
Executive cars
Sedans
Road transport of heads of state